Alexander or Alex Collins may refer to:

Alex Collins (politician) (1876–1949), mayor
Alex Collins (American football) (born 1994), American football player
Alexander L. Collins (1812–1901), Wisconsin Whig politician and judge
Alexander Collins, fictional character in the comic Tribe

See also
Sandy Collins (disambiguation)